Robin Manullang (born 11 April 1987) is an Indonesian professional road bicycle racer, who most recently rode for UCI Continental team . He won a silver medal in the  individual time trial, a bronze medal in the  road race and a gold medal in the  team road race at the 2013 Southeast Asian Games. At the 2015 Southeast Asian Games, he won a gold medal in the individual time trial.

Major results

2010
 10th Overall Tour de East Java
2011
 2nd  Team time trial, Southeast Asian Games
2012
 6th Time trial, Asian Road Championships
2013
 Southeast Asian Games
1st  Team road race
2nd  Time trial
3rd  Road race
 9th Overall Tour de Singkarak
2015
 1st  Time trial, Southeast Asian Games
2016
 5th Overall Tour de Flores
2017
 3rd  Team pursuit, Southeast Asian Games
2018
 10th Road race, Asian Games
2019
 Southeast Asian Games
2nd  Team road race
2nd  Team time trial
 3rd Time trial, National Road Championships

References

External links

1987 births
Living people
Indonesian male cyclists
People of Batak descent
People from Samarinda
Southeast Asian Games medalists in cycling
Southeast Asian Games gold medalists for Indonesia
Southeast Asian Games silver medalists for Indonesia
Southeast Asian Games bronze medalists for Indonesia
Cyclists at the 2018 Asian Games
Competitors at the 2013 Southeast Asian Games
Competitors at the 2015 Southeast Asian Games
Competitors at the 2017 Southeast Asian Games
Asian Games competitors for Indonesia
Competitors at the 2019 Southeast Asian Games